The Juan Barjola Museum of Painting is a museum located in Gijon, principality of Asturias, Spain. The museum was inaugurated in 1988, after a donation by artist  of 104 works from the years 1950–1988. It is under the auspices of the Cultural Council of the Principality of Asturias.

Exhibition 
The exhibition occupies three of the four stories of the building.  The lower floor is for temporary expositions.  The exhibition starts on the third floor, with very early works from the 1950s.  It continues on the second floor with works from the 1970s, ending on the first floor with paintings from the 1980s.

References

Museums in Asturias
Art museums and galleries in Spain
Art museums established in 1988
1988 establishments in Spain
Gijón